Charles Edward Curzon (15 April 1878, in Kensington – 1954) was an Anglican bishop, the 6th Bishop of Stepney from 1928 until 1936 when he was appointed Bishop of Exeter.

He educated at Lancaster Royal Grammar School and Christ's College, Cambridge. He embarked on an ecclesiastical career with a curacy at West Kensington. Incumbencies at Sheffield St Oswald's and Goole followed before elevation to the Suffragan Bishopric of Bishop of Stepney in 1928, a post he held until promotion to the Exeter See in 1936.

Notes

Bishops of Stepney
Bishops of Chester
20th-century Church of England bishops
People educated at Lancaster Royal Grammar School
Alumni of Christ's College, Cambridge
1878 births

1954 deaths